Jean Benguigui (born 8 April 1944 in Oran) is a French actor. He is of Jewish-Algerian descent. In 2006 and 2007 he played the role of impresario Cartoni in a new adaptation of the operetta Le Chanteur de Mexico at the Théâtre du Châtelet.

Filmography

Theatre

Dubbing

Author

References

External links 

 

1944 births
Living people
French male stage actors
French male television actors
French male film actors
20th-century French Jews
French people of Algerian-Jewish descent
People from Oran
Pieds-Noirs
20th-century French male actors
21st-century French male actors